Loukima Tamukini (born, Lukima Tamukini, 6 September 1975 in Kinshasa) is an ex-Congolese footballer who played as defensive midfielder.

International career
Lukima played for Zaire at the 1994 editions of the Africa Cup of Nations, with tournament ending in quarter-final exits.

References

External links

1975 births
Living people
Footballers from Kinshasa
Democratic Republic of the Congo footballers
Association football midfielders
AS Vita Club players
Liga Portugal 2 players
Segunda Divisão players
Leixões S.C. players
F.C. Penafiel players
F.C. Maia players
C.D. Feirense players
Gondomar S.C. players
F.C. Marco players
S.C. Olhanense players
Louletano D.C. players
Democratic Republic of the Congo international footballers
Democratic Republic of the Congo expatriate footballers
Expatriate footballers in France
Expatriate footballers in Portugal
Democratic Republic of the Congo expatriate sportspeople in Portugal
21st-century Democratic Republic of the Congo people